Heidi Sprung Vasudevan (born 10 January 1969) is a former professional tennis player from Austria.

Biography
Sprung, who is originally from Salzburg, played Fed Cup tennis for Austria in 1988. She teamed up with Judith Wiesner to win the deciding doubles rubber over Belgium, setting up a second round tie with the USSR. Against the USSR she beat world number 16 Larisa Savchenko in the singles, but this time lost the live doubles rubber.

On the WTA Tour she was most successful as a doubles player, with a career best ranking of 97. She was a doubles finalist at the 1989 Fernleaf Classic in Wellington.

Since retiring she has lived in Switzerland and is married to former India Davis Cup team representative Srinivasan Vasudevan. The pair run a tennis club in Zofingen.

WTA Tour career finals

Doubles: 1 runner-up

ITF finals

Singles (0–2)

Doubles (3–5)

References

External links
 
 
 

1969 births
Living people
Austrian female tennis players
Sportspeople from Salzburg
Austrian expatriate sportspeople in Switzerland